Haitian Creole, commonly referred to as simply Creole, or Kreyòl in the Creole language, is a French-based creole language spoken by 10–12million people worldwide, and is one of the two official languages of Haiti (the other being French), where it is the native language of a majority of the population.

The language emerged from contact between French settlers and enslaved Africans during the Atlantic slave trade in the French colony of Saint-Domingue (now Haiti) in the 17th and 18th centuries. Although its vocabulary largely derives from 18th-century French, its grammar is that of a West African Volta-Congo language branch, particularly the Fongbe and Igbo languages. It also has influences from Spanish, English, Portuguese, Taino, and other West African languages. It is not mutually intelligible with standard French, and has its own distinctive grammar. Haitians are the largest community in the world speaking a modern creole language, according to some sources. However, this is disputable, as Nigerian Pidgin, an English-based Creole language, is attested by some sources to have a larger number of speakers than that of Haitian Creole and other French-based Creole languages, particularly if non-native speakers are included.

The usage of, and education in, Haitian Creole has been contentious since at least the 19thcentury. Some Haitians view French as a legacy of colonialism, while Creole has been maligned by francophones as a miseducated person's French. Until the late 20thcentury, Haitian presidents spoke only standard French to their fellow citizens, and until the 21st century, all instruction at Haitian elementary schools was in modern standard French, a second language to most of their students.

Haitian Creole is also spoken in regions that have received migration from Haiti, including other Caribbean islands, French Guiana, France, Canada (particularly Quebec) and the United States. It is related to Antillean Creole, spoken in the Lesser Antilles, and to other French-based creole languages.

Etymology
The word creole comes from the Portuguese term , which means "a person raised in one's house", from the Latin , which means "to create, make, bring forth, produce, beget". In the New World, the term originally referred to Europeans born and raised in overseas colonies (as opposed to the European-born peninsulares). To be "as rich as a Creole" at one time was a popular saying boasted in Paris during the colonial years of Saint-Domingue, for being the most lucrative colony in the world. The noun Creole eventually came to denote mixed-race Creole peoples and their mixed Creole languages.

Origins

Haitian Creole contains elements from both the Romance group of Indo-European languages through its superstrate, French, as well as influences from African languages. There are many theories on the formation of the Haitian Creole language.

One theory estimates that Haitian Creole developed between 1680 and 1740. During the 16th and 17th centuries, French and Spanish colonizers produced tobacco, cotton, and sugar cane on the island. The sugar crops needed a much larger labor force, which led to an increase in slave importation. In the 18th century an estimated 800,000 West-African individuals were enslaved and brought to Saint-Domingue. As the slave population increased, interactions between French-speaking colonists and slaves decreased.

Many African slaves in French ownership were from Niger-Congo-speaking territory, and particularly speakers of Kwa languages, such as Gbe from West Africa and the Central Tano languages, and Bantu languages from Central Africa. Singler suggests that the number of Bantu speakers decreased while the number of Kwa speakers increased, with Gbe being the most dominant group. The first fifty years of 's sugar boom coincided with emergent Gbe predominance in the French Caribbean. In the interval during which Singler hypothesizes the language evolved, the Gbe population was around 50% of the imported slave population.

Enslaved individuals lacked a mode of communication and as a result would try to learn French to communicate with one another. With the constant importation of slaves, the language was increasingly used and gradually became distinct from French. The language was also picked up by other members of the community and became used by the majority of those born in what is now Haiti.

Difference between Haitian Creole and French
Haitian Creole and French have similar pronunciations and share many lexical items. However, many cognate terms actually have different meanings. In addition, the grammars of Haitian Creole and French are very different. For example, in Haitian Creole, verbs are not conjugated as they are in French. Additionally, Haitian Creole possesses different phonetics from standard French; however, it is similar in phonetic structure. The phrase-structure is another similarity between Haitian Creole and French but differs slightly in that it contains details from its African substratum language.

Both Haitian Creole and French have also experienced semantic change: words that had a single meaning in the  have changed or have been replaced in both languages.

Lefebvre proposed the theory of relexification, arguing that the process of relexification (the replacement of the phonological representation of a substratum lexical item with the phonological representation of a superstratum lexical item, so that the Haitian creole lexical item looks like French, but works like the substratum language(s)) was central in the development of Haitian Creole.

The Fon language, also known as the Fongbe language, is a modern Gbe language native to Benin, Nigeria and Togo in West Africa. This language has a grammatical structure similar to Haitian Creole, possibly making Creole a relexification of Fon with vocabulary from French. The two languages are often compared:

Taino Influence
There are a number of Taino influences in Hatian Creole; many objects, fruits and animals name are either haitianize or have a similar pronunciation. Many towns, places or sites have their official name being a translation of the Taino word.

Langay
Langay is a specialized vocabulary used in Haiti for religion, song, and dance purposes. It appears to not be an actual language, but rather an assortment of words, songs, and incantations – some secret – from various languages once used in Haitian Vodoun ceremonies.

History

Early development
Haitian Creole developed in the 17th and 18th centuries in the colony of Saint-Domingue, in a setting that mixed speakers of various Niger–Congo languages with French colonials. In the early 1940s under President , attempts were made to standardize the language. American linguistic expert Frank Laubach and Irish Methodist missionary H. Ormonde McConnell developed a standardized Haitian Creole orthography. Although some regarded the orthography highly, it was generally not well received. Its orthography was standardized in 1979. That same year Haitian Creole was elevated in status by the Act of 18 September 1979. The  established an official orthography for Creole, and slight modifications were made over the next two decades.

Becoming an official language
The Constitution of 1987 upgraded Haitian Creole to a national language alongside French. The Constitution of 1987 names both Haitian Creole and French as the official languages, but recognizes Haitian Creole as the only language that all Haitians hold in common. French is spoken by only a small percentage of citizens.

Literature development
Even without government recognition, by the end of the 19th century, there were already literary texts written in Haitian Creole such as 's  and 's .  was another influential author of Haitian Creole work. Since the 1980s, many educators, writers, and activists have written literature in Haitian Creole. In 2001, Open Gate: An Anthology of Haitian Creole Poetry was published. It was the first time a collection of Haitian Creole poetry was published in both Haitian Creole and English. On 28 October 2004, the Haitian daily  first published an entire edition in Haitian Creole in observance of the country's newly instated "Creole Day". Haitian Creole writers often use different literary strategies throughout their works, such as code-switching, to increase the audiences knowledge on the language. Literature in Haitian Creole is also used to educate the public on the dictatorial social and political forces in Haiti.

List of Haitian Creole-language writers
  (b. 1962), poet and novelist
  (b. 1936), poet, playwright, painter, musician, activist
  (b. 1967), international press activist
  (1942-2017), poet, novelist and art critic
  (1912-1998), poet and playwright
  (b. 1956), writer and visual artist
  (b. 1956), poet and novelist
  (b. 1982), poet

Sociolinguistics

Role in society

Although both French and Haitian Creole are official languages in Haiti, French is often considered the high language and Haitian Creole as the low language in the diglossic relationship of these two languages in society. That is to say, for the minority of Haitian population that is bilingual, the use of these two languages largely depends on the social context: standard French is used more in public, especially in formal situations, whereas Haitian Creole is used more on a daily basis and is often heard in ordinary conversation.

There is a large population in Haiti that speaks only Haitian Creole, whether under formal or informal conditions:

Use in educational system
In most schools, French is still the preferred language for teaching. Generally speaking, Creole is more used in public schools, as that is where most children of ordinary families who speak Creole attend school.

Historically, the education system has been French-dominant. Except the children of elites, many had to drop out of school because learning French was very challenging to them and they had a hard time to follow up. The Bernard Reform of 1978 tried to introduce Creole as the teaching language in the first four years of primary school; however, the reform overall was not very successful. As a result, the use of Creole has grown but in a very limited way. After the earthquake in 2010, basic education became free and more accessible to the monolingual masses. The government is still trying to expand the use of Creole and improve the school system.

Orthography

Haitian Creole has a phonemic orthography with highly regular spelling, except for proper nouns and foreign words.

 There are no silent letters in the Haitian Creole orthography.
 All sounds are always spelled the same, except when a vowel carries a grave accent , which makes it an oral vowel instead of a nasal vowel:

Haitian orthography debate
The first technical orthography for Haitian Creole was developed in 1940 by H. Ormonde McConnell and Primrose McConnell, Irish Methodist missionaries. It was later revised with the help of Frank Laubach, resulting in the creation of what is known as the McConnell–Laubach orthography.

The McConnell–Laubach orthography received substantial criticism from members of the Haitian elite. Haitian scholar Charles Pressoir critiqued the McConnell–Laubach orthography for its lack of codified front rounded vowels, which are typically used only by francophone elites. This criticism of the "American look" of the orthography was shared by many educated Haitians, who also criticized its association with Protestantism. The last of Pressoir's criticisms was that "the use of the circumflex to mark nasalized vowels" treated nasal sounds differently from the way they are represented in French, which he feared would inhibit the learning of French.

The creation of the orthography was essentially an articulation of the language ideologies of those involved and brought out political and social tensions between competing groups. A large portion of this tension lay in the ideology held by many that the French language is superior, which led to resentment of the language by some Haitians and an admiration for it from others. This orthographical controversy boiled down to an attempt to unify a conception of Haitian national identity.

French-based orthography
When Haiti was still a colony of France, edicts by the French government were often written in a French-lexicon creole and read aloud to the slave population. The first written text of Haitian Creole was composed in the French-lexicon in a poem called Lisette quitté la plaine in 1757 by Duvivier de la Mahautière, a White Creole planter.

Before Haitian Creole orthography was standardized in the late 20th century, spelling varied, but was based on subjecting spoken HaitianCreole to written French, a language whose spelling has a complicated relation to pronunciation. Unlike the phonetic orthography, French orthography of HaitianCreole is not standardized and varies according to the writer; some use exact French spelling, others adjust the spelling of certain words to represent pronunciation of the cognate in HaitianCreole, removing the silent letters. For example: ( "He goes to work in the morning") could be transcribed as:
 ,
 , or
 .

Grammar
Haitian Creole grammar is highly analytical: for example, verbs are not inflected for tense or person, and there is no grammatical gender, which means that adjectives and articles are not inflected according to the noun. The primary word order is subject–verb–object as it is in French and English.

Many grammatical features, particularly the pluralization of nouns and indication of possession, are indicated by appending certain markers, like , to the main word. There has been a debate going on for some years as to whether these markers are affixes or clitics, and if punctuation such as the hyphen should be used to connect them to the word.

Although the language's vocabulary has many words related to their French-language cognates, its sentence structure is like that of the West African Fon language.

Pronouns
There are six pronouns: first, second, and third person, each in both singular, and plural; all are of French etymological origin. There is no difference between direct and indirect objects.

Possessive pronouns

Singular

Plural

Plural of nouns
Definite nouns are made plural when followed by the word ; indefinite plural nouns are unmarked.

Possession
Possession is indicated by placing the possessor or possessive pronoun after the item possessed. Note, however, that this is not considered the standard Kreyòl most often heard in the media or used in writing.

Possession does not indicate definiteness ("my friend" as opposed to "a friend of mine"), and possessive constructions are often followed by a definite article.

Indefinite article
Both are used only with singular nouns, and are placed before the noun:

Definite article
In Haitian Creole, the definite article has five forms, and it is placed after the noun it modifies. The final syllable of the preceding word determines which form the definite article takes. If the last sound is an oral consonant or a glide (spelled 'y' or 'w'), and if it is preceded by an oral vowel, the definite article is :

If the last sound is an oral consonant and is preceded by a nasal vowel, the definite article is :

If the last sound is an oral vowel and is preceded by an oral consonant, the definite article is :

If the last sound is any oral vowel other than i or ou and is preceded by a nasal consonant, then the definite article is also a:

Demonstratives
As in English, it may be used as a demonstrative, except that it is placed after the noun that it qualifies.

As in English, it may also be used as a pronoun, replacing a noun:

Verbs
Many verbs in Haitian Creole are the same spoken words as the French infinitive, but there is no conjugation in the language; the verbs have one form only, and changes in tense, mood, and aspect are indicated by the use of markers:

Copula

The concept expressed in English by the verb "tobe" is expressed in Haitian Creole by three words, and sometimes .

The verb  (pronounced similarly to the English word "say") is used to link a subject with a predicate nominative:

The subject  or  can sometimes be omitted with :

 also means "tobe", but is placed exclusively at the end of a sentence, after the predicate and the subject (in that order):

Haitian Creole has stative verbs, which means that the verb "tobe" is notovert when followed by an adjective. Therefore,  means both "sick" and "":

To have

There is
The verb  (or ) also means "there is" or "there are":

To know

To do
 means "do" or "make". It has a broad range of meanings, as it is one of the most common verbs used in idiomatic phrases.

To be able to
It refers to both "capability" and "availability":

Tense markers
There is no conjugation in Haitian Creole. In the present non-progressive tense, one just uses the basic verb form for stative verbs:

When the basic form of action verbs is used without any verb markers, it is generally understood as referring to the past:

 means both "food" and "to eat", as  does in Canadian French;  means "I am eating good food".

For other tenses, special "tense marker" words are placed before the verb. The basic ones are:

Simple past or past perfect:

Past progressive:

Present progressive:

For the present progressive, it is customary, though not necessary, to add  ("rightnow"):

Also,  can mean "will eat" depending on the context of the sentence:

Near or definite future:

Future:

Other examples:

Negation
The word  comes before a verb and any tense markers to negate it:

Lexicon

Most of the lexicon of Creole is derived from French, with significant changes in pronunciation and morphology; often the French definite article was retained as part of the noun. For example, the French definite article la in la lune ("the moon") was incorporated into the Creole noun for moon: . However, the language also inherited many words of different origins, among them Wolof, Fon, Kongo, English, Spanish, Portuguese, Taino and Arabic.

Haitian Creole creates and borrows new words to describe new or old concepts and realities.

Sample

and 
The word  generally means "foreigner" or "not from Haiti".

Etymologically, the word  is derived from the French  and is cognate with the Spanish  ("black", both the color and the people).

Some Haitians consider such labels as offensive because of their association with color discrimination and the Haitian class system, while others use the terms freely.

Examples

Salutations

Proverbs and expressions

Proverbs play a central role in traditional Haitian culture and Haitian Creole speakers make frequent use of them as well as of other metaphors.

Proverbs

Expressions

Usage abroad

United States and Canada

Haitian Creole is used widely among Haitians who have relocated to other countries, particularly the United States and Canada. Some of the larger Creole-speaking populations are found in Montreal, Quebec (where French is the official language), New York City, Boston, and Central and South Florida (Miami, Fort Lauderdale, and Palm Beach). To reach out to the large Haitian population, government agencies have produced various public service announcements, school-parent communications, and other materials in Haitian Creole. For instance, Miami-Dade County in Florida sends out paper communications in Haitian Creole in addition to English and Spanish. In the Boston area, the Boston subway system and area hospitals and medical offices post announcements in Haitian Creole as well as English. North America's only Creole-language television network is HBN, based in Miami.  These areas also each have more than half a dozen Creole-language AM radio stations.

Haitian Creole and Haitian culture are taught in many colleges in the United States and the Bahamas. York College at the City University of New York features a minor in Haitian Creole. Indiana University has a Creole Institute founded by Albert Valdman where Haitian Creole, among other facets of Haiti, are studied and researched. The University of Kansas, Lawrence has an Institute of Haitian studies, founded by Bryant Freeman. The University of Massachusetts Boston, Florida International University, and University of Florida offer seminars and courses annually at their Haitian Creole Summer Institute. Brown University, University of Miami, and Duke University also offer Haitian Creole classes, and Columbia University and NYU have jointly offered a course since 2015. The University of Chicago began offering Creole courses in 2010.

, the New York City Department of Education counted 2,838 Haitian Creole-speaking English-language learners (ELLs) in the city's K–12 schools, making it the seventh most common home language of ELLs citywide and the fifth most common home language of Brooklyn ELLs. Because of the large population of Haitian Creole-speaking students within NYC schools, various organizations have been established to respond to the needs of these students. For example, Flanbwayan and Gran Chimen Sant Kiltirèl, both located in Brooklyn, New York, aim to promote education and Haitian culture through advocacy, literacy projects, and cultural/artistic endeavors.

Cuba

Haitian Creole is the second most spoken language in Cuba after Spanish, where over 300,000 Haitian immigrants speak it. It is recognized as a minority language in Cuba and a considerable number of Cubans speak it fluently. Most of these speakers have never been to Haiti and do not possess Haitian ancestry, but merely learned it in their communities. In addition, there is a Haitian Creole radio station operating in Havana.

Dominican Republic

, the language was also spoken by over 450,000 Haitians who reside in the neighboring Dominican Republic, although the locals do not speak it. However, some estimates suggest that there are over a million speakers due to a huge population of undocumented immigrants from Haiti.

The Bahamas
As of 2009, up to 80,000 Haitians were estimated residing in the Bahamas, where about 20,000 speak Haitian Creole. It is the third most‑spoken language after English and Bahamian Creole.

Software
After the 2010 Haiti earthquake, international aid workers desperately needed translation tools for communicating in Haitian Creole. Furthermore, international organizations had little idea whom to contact as translators. As an emergency measure, Carnegie Mellon University released data for its own research into the public domain. Microsoft Research and Google Translate implemented alpha version machine translators based on the Carnegie Mellon data.

Several smartphone apps have been released, including learning with flashcards by Byki and two medical dictionaries, one by Educa Vision and a second by Ultralingua, the latter of which includes an audio phrase book and a section on cultural anthropology.

See also

 Afro-Brazilians
 Akademi Kreyòl Ayisyen
 Antillean Creole French
 Creole language
 Louisiana Creole French
 Michel DeGraff
 Radio Haiti-Inter

References

Further reading

External links

 
 Haitian Creole basic vocabulary (from Wiktionary's Swadesh-list appendix)
Haitian Creole-English dictionary (PDF)

 
Languages of Haiti
Subject–verb–object languages
Languages of the African diaspora
Articles containing video clips